The Continence of Scipio is a 1640 oil on canvas painting by Nicolas Poussin, commissioned by Abbé Gian Maria Roscioli, secretary to Pope Urban VIII. It changed owners several times, reaching the Walpole collection in the first half of the 18th century, from which it was bought for the Hermitage Museum by Catherine the Great in 1779. It was reassigned to the Pushkin Museum in 1930, where it remains.

References

1640 paintings
Paintings by Nicolas Poussin
Paintings in the collection of the Pushkin Museum
History paintings
Second Punic War
Cultural depictions of Scipio Africanus